Nationality words link to articles with information on the nation's poetry or literature (for instance, Irish or France).

Events
 Louise Labé met Clément Marot in the salon of William Scève's brother Maurice.

Works published
 John Lydgate, published anonymously, Life of St. Alban and St. Amphibalus, translated from French into English

Births
Death years link to the corresponding "[year] in poetry" article:
 June 3 – Hosokawa Fujitaka 細川藤孝, also known as Hosokawa Yūsai 細川幽斎 (died 1610), a Japanese, Sengoku period feudal warlord and poet
 October 18 – Jean Passerat (died 1602), French political satirist and poet
 Also:
 March 19 – Joseph of Anchieta (died 1597), Spanish Jesuit poet and playwright
 George Gascoigne, birth year uncertain (died 1577), English poet
 Lucas de Heere (died 1584), Flemish portrait painter, poet and writer
 Fernando de Herrera (died 1597), Spanish
 Rabbi Isaac Luria (died 1572), Jewish mystic and poet in Palestine

Deaths
Birth years link to the corresponding "[year] in poetry" article:

See also

 Poetry
 16th century in poetry
 16th century in literature
 French Renaissance literature
 Renaissance literature
 Spanish Renaissance literature

Notes

16th-century poetry
Poetry